August Detlev Christian Twesten (born in Glückstadt, April 11, 1789; died in Berlin, January 8, 1876) was a Lutheran theologian of Germany.

Biography
He studied at the University of Kiel, and for a period of time, worked as a gymnasium teacher in Berlin. In 1814 he returned to Kiel as an associate professor of philosophy and theology, and soon ranked next to Claus Harms in the Lutheran church of Holstein. In 1835 he succeeded Friedrich Schleiermacher at the University of Berlin, and in 1850 became a member of the new supreme ecclesiastical council of the United Evangelical Church. He was one of the chief representatives of those who strive to reconcile the views of Schleiermacher with orthodox Lutheranism.

Published works 
Vorlesungen über die Dogmatik der evangelisch-lutherischen Kirche ("Lectures on the dogma of the Evangelical Lutheran Church"; 2 vols., Hamburg, 1826–37).
Grundriss der analytischen Logik ("Outline of analytical logic"; Kiel, 1834).
Friedrich Schleiermachers Grundriss der philosophischen Ethik ("Schleiermacher's Grundriss der philosophischen Ethik", 1841).

Family
His son Karl Twesten was a noted politician and author.

References

1789 births
1876 deaths
People from Glückstadt
German Lutheran theologians
University of Kiel alumni
Academic staff of the University of Kiel
Academic staff of the Humboldt University of Berlin
19th-century German Protestant theologians
19th-century German male writers
German male non-fiction writers
19th-century Lutherans